Gabriëlle Popken (born 21 August 1983) is a Dutch former politician for the Party for Freedom. She served in the Senate between 2011 and 2017 and subsequently in the House of Representatives between 2017 and 2020.

Youth and education

Popken was born in Geleen on 21 August 1983. Between 2003 and 2007 she studied law at Maastricht University, earning a bachelor's degree. The subsequent year she earned a master's degree in commercial law at the same university.

Political career

She became a parliamentary assistant to Geert Wilders on 4 May 2009. Popken became a member of the Senate for the Party for Freedom on 7 June 2011. Popken took maternity leave per 8 September 2015 and was replaced by Peter van Dijk, it was the first time in the history of the Senate that a senator was replaced due to a maternity leave. She returned to the Senate on 29 December. Popken was elected to the House of Representatives in the 2017 Dutch general election and took up her seat on 23 March 2017. From 31 March 2018 to 20 July 2018 she was on pregnancy and maternity leave and was temporarily replaced by Emiel van Dijk. Popken left the House on 31 August 2020, having already been absent for several months due to health reasons. She was succeeded by Sietse Fritsma.

Personal life

Popken is married to fellow politician Marcel de Graaff.

References

1983 births
Living people
21st-century Dutch politicians
Maastricht University alumni
Members of the House of Representatives (Netherlands)
Members of the Senate (Netherlands)
Party for Freedom politicians
People from Geleen